is a retired Japanese sprinter, who specialized in the 400 metres. Kida competed for the women's 4 × 400 m relay at the 2008 Summer Olympics in Beijing, along with her teammates Sayaka Aoki, Satomi Kubokura, and Asami Tanno. She ran on the third leg of the first heat, with an individual-split time of 52.72 seconds. Kida and her team finished the relay in last place for a seasonal best time of 3:30.52, failing to advance into the final.

International competition

References

External links

NBC 2008 Olympics profile
Mayu Kida at JAAF 
Mayu Kida at TBS  (archived)

1982 births
Living people
Japanese female sprinters
Sportspeople from Hokkaido
Olympic athletes of Japan
Athletes (track and field) at the 2008 Summer Olympics
World Athletics Championships athletes for Japan
Athletes (track and field) at the 2002 Asian Games
Athletes (track and field) at the 2006 Asian Games
Asian Games competitors for Japan
Japan Championships in Athletics winners
Olympic female sprinters
20th-century Japanese women
21st-century Japanese women